Antonio Fratacci (Parma or Bologna) was an Italian painter of the first half of the 18th century.

Biography
He was a pupil of Ilario Spolverini and later of Carlo Cignani.  He was active in 1738. He is known to have painted an altarpiece for the church of San Francesco in Reggio Emilia. he also painted for the churches of Sant'Alessandro, San Eustorgio, Santa Maria della Scala, and San Simpliciano in Milan.

References

18th-century Italian painters
Italian male painters
Painters from Parma
18th-century Italian male artists